Dean Kenneally (born 8 March 1967 in Victoria) is an Australian physiotherapist whose area of expertise is hamstring injuries on athletes. Kenneally is the primary team physio for Chelsea FC.

Previously he has worked for Tottenham Hotspur, as well as the Australian and English national athletics teams.

During his active sports career he was an 800 metres runner. His greatest achievement was a silver medal at the 1991 Universiade. He also participated at the 1994 Commonwealth Games, finishing 5th in his heat while affected by an achilles tendon injury incurred 12 days before the heat on 23 August 1994. He also won the Australian 800m Championship in 1990, was placed 3rd in 1991, 2nd in 1992 later running his lifetime best of 1:46.54 in Dijon, France on 12 June 1992 before placing 7th in the World Cup in Havana, Cuba on 26 September 1992. Following an operation on his achilles tendon on 15 April 1995, and a stress fracture of the foot in 1997, he retired to concentrate on his successful Physiotherapy career.

He was educated at Wesley College, Melbourne.

References

External links
Australian Athletics

1967 births
Living people
Australian male middle-distance runners
Association football physiotherapists
Sportsmen from Victoria (Australia)
People educated at Wesley College (Victoria)
Athletes (track and field) at the 1994 Commonwealth Games
Universiade medalists in athletics (track and field)
Universiade silver medalists for Australia
Medalists at the 1991 Summer Universiade
Commonwealth Games competitors for Australia
Chelsea F.C. non-playing staff
Tottenham Hotspur F.C. non-playing staff